The 1941–42 Nationalliga A season was the fourth season of the Nationalliga A, the top level of ice hockey in Switzerland. Seven teams participated in the league, and HC Davos won the championship.

Standings

External links
 Championnat de Suisse 1941/42

Swiss
National League (ice hockey) seasons
1941–42 in Swiss ice hockey